The Frontbench Team of Ian Blackford was the team of Scottish National Party Spokespersons in the House of Commons from 2017 to 2022.

Ian Blackford, who was elected Leader of the Scottish National Party's parliamentary group in the House of Commons on 14 June 2017 following Angus Robertson's defeat in the general election, announced his frontbench team on 20 June. Blackford announced his revised frontbench team on 7 January 2020 following the 2019 general election. On 1 February 2021, a reshuffle of the SNP frontbench team at Westminster was announced.

Blackford Westminster Group Frontbench Leadership

Frontbench

Other Portfolio

Whips Office

Former members 
Neale Hanvey, Shadow Minister for COVID Vaccine Deployment

See also
Cabinet of the United Kingdom
Official Opposition Shadow Cabinet (United Kingdom)
Liberal Democrat frontbench team

Notes

References

External links
Scottish National Party Spokespersons

2017 establishments in the United Kingdom
2017 in British politics
2010s in the United Kingdom
British shadow cabinets
Politics of the United Kingdom
Scottish National Party